Richard Turner (15 August 1843 – 22 December 1917) was a Canadian merchant and legislator.

Born in Quebec City, Quebec, the son of James Turner and Susans Frisell, Turner opened a wholesale grocery with a partner called Whitehead & Turner in 1870. In 1886, after Whitehead retired, Turner became the sole owner.

He was appointed to the Legislative Council of Quebec for the division of Golfe in 1897. A Liberal, he served until his death in 1917.

In 1867, he married Emily Maria Ellis. They had four sons and two daughters. One son, Lieutenant General Sir Richard Ernest William Turner, was a Canadian general and recipient of the Victoria Cross.

References
 
 

1843 births
1917 deaths
Politicians from Quebec City
Quebec Liberal Party MLCs
Burials at Mount Hermon Cemetery